Vladimir Viktorovich Grigorev (born 8 August 1982) is a Russian short track speed skater. He previously competed for Ukraine. Grigorev is from Sumy in Ukraine.

Career
Grigorev competed for Ukraine in short track speed skating at the 2002 Winter Olympics, and the 2006 Torino Winter Olympics.

He did not compete at the 2010 Olympics, and, in 2007, switched allegiance to Russia, due to a shortage of skating facilities in Ukraine.

He qualified to compete for Russia at the 2014 Sochi Winter Olympics. On 15 February 2014, he won a silver medal in the 1000m short track speedskating event, as part of the first Russian 1-2 finish in short track, with Viktor Ahn winning gold. With his silver, at 31 years and 191 days of age, Grigorev became the oldest man to win a short track Olympic medal. On 21 February 2014, he won a gold medal in 5000m-relay as part of Team Russia.

References

External links
Vladimir Grigorev's profile, from http://www.sochi2014.com; retrieved 2014-02-14.
International Skating Union Profile

1982 births
Living people
Russian male short track speed skaters
Ukrainian male short track speed skaters
Olympic short track speed skaters of Russia
Olympic short track speed skaters of Ukraine
Olympic medalists in short track speed skating
Olympic gold medalists for Russia
Olympic silver medalists for Russia
Short track speed skaters at the 2002 Winter Olympics
Short track speed skaters at the 2006 Winter Olympics
Short track speed skaters at the 2014 Winter Olympics
Medalists at the 2014 Winter Olympics
Ukrainian emigrants to Russia
Naturalised citizens of Russia
People from Shostka
Sportspeople from Sumy Oblast